1907 in the Philippines details events of note that happened in the Philippines in the year 1907.

Events

June
 June 3 – Centro Escolar University established as Centro Escolar de Señoritas.

July
 July 30 – First Philippine Assembly elections were held.

August
 August 20 – The province of Agusan is founded.

September
 September 13 – Macario Sakay was executed in Manila.

October
 October 16 – The First Philippine Assembly was held in the old Manila Grand Opera House.

Date unknown
 The Philippine Football Federation is established.

Holidays
As per Act No. 345 issued on February 1, 1902, any legal holiday of fixed date falls on Sunday, the next succeeding day shall be observed as legal holiday. Sundays are also considered legal religious holidays.

 January 1 – New Year's Day
 February 22 – Legal Holiday
 March 28 – Maundy Thursday
 March 29 – Good Friday
 July 4 – Legal Holiday
 August 13  – Legal Holiday
 November 28 – Thanksgiving Day
 December 25 – Christmas Day
 December 30 – Rizal Day

Death
 September 13 - Macario Sakay, Filipino Revolutionary.

References